Zero Liquid Discharge (ZLD) is a water treatment process designed to remove all the liquid waste from a system. The focus of ZLD is to reduce wastewater economically and produce clean water that is suitable for reuse (e.g. irrigation), thereby saving money and being beneficial to the environment. ZLD systems employ advanced wastewater/desalination treatment technologies to purify and recycle virtually all of the wastewater produced.

ZLD technologies also help plants meet discharge and water reuse requirements, enabling businesses to:

meet stringent government discharge regulations
reach higher water recovery (%)
treat and recover valuable materials from the wastewater streams, such as potassium sulfate, caustic soda, sodium sulfate, lithium and gypsum

The conventional way to reach ZLD is with thermal technologies such as evaporators (multi stage flash (MSF), multi effect distillation (MED) and mechanical vapor compression (MCV) and crystallizers and recover their condensate. Thus, ZLD plants produce solid waste.

ZLD discharge system overview
ZLD technology includes pre-treatment and evaporation of the industrial effluent until the dissolved solids precipitate as crystals. These crystals are removed and dewatered with a filter press or a centrifuge. The water vapor from evaporation is condensed and returned to the process.

In the last decades though, there has been an effort from the water treatment industry to revolutionize the high water recovery and ZLD technologies. This has led to processes like electrodialysis (ED/EDR), forward osmosis (FO) and membrane distillation (MD). A quick overview and comparison can be seen by the following table:

Configuration 

Despite the variable sources of a wastewater stream, a ZLD system is generally comprised by two steps

 Pre-Concentration; Pre-concentrating the brine is usually achieved with membrane brine concentrators or electrodialysis (ED). These technologies concentrate the stream to a high salinity and are able to recover up to 60–80% of the water.
 Evaporation/Crystallization; The next step with thermal processes or evaporation, evaporates all the leftover water, collect it, and drives it for reuse. The waste that is left behind then goes to a crystallizer which boils all the water until all the impurities crystallize and are filtered out as a solid.

See also
 Effluent guidelines (US wastewater regulations)
 Effluent limitation

References

External links
ZLD Treatment Process Stages

Building engineering
Environmental engineering